Phyllobius glaucus is a species of weevil found across Europe, especially in carrs. It is a pest of a variety of fruit trees, but has little economic effect. It was first described by Giovanni Antonio Scopoli in 1763.

Description
The body is black, but is covered with elongate, hair-like scales that give the animal a very variable, greenish-brown appearance. The legs are reddish brown.

Distribution
Phyllobius glaucus is common and widespread in Europe. A single specimen of P. glaucus (under the name P. calcaratus) has been recorded from Canada, but this is thought to be an error.

Ecology and life cycle

Phyllobius glaucus is associated with a wide range of trees and shrubs, and is a minor pest of fruit trees, including apples, pears, cherries and plums. The insects chew small holes in the leaves and petals of the trees. It is a typical component of the fauna of alder carr in northwestern Europe.

Taxonomic history
Phyllobius glaucus was first described by Giovanni Antonio Scopoli in his 1763 work , under the name Curculio glaucus. A second species was later named Curculio glaucus, but has since been renamed to Coniocleonus glaucus. Taxonomic synonyms of Phyllobius glaucus include:

Curculio glaucus Scopoli, 1763
Curculio coelestinus Scopoli, 1763
Curculio carniolicus Gmelin, 1790
Curculio calcaratus Fabricius, 1792
Phyllobius calcaratus (Fabricius, 1792)
Curculio caesius Marsham, 1802
Curculio cnides Marsham, 1802
Phyllobius atrovirens Gyllenhal, 1834
Phyllobius alneti C. G. Thomson, 1859
Phyllobius maculatus Tournier, 1877
Phyllobius nudus Westhoff, 1882
Phyllobius densatus Schilsky, 1886
Phyllobius schilskyi Faust, 1890
Phyllobius nigripes Gerhardt, 1900
Phyllobius nigrofemoratus Gabriel, 1900
Phyllobius fuscofumosus Reitter, 1906
Phyllobius tibialis Schilsky, 1908
Phyllobius pseudodensatus Reitter, 1916

Further reading

References 

Entiminae
Beetles of Europe
Beetles described in 1763
Taxa named by Giovanni Antonio Scopoli